Thomas Nunn (21 January 1846 – 31 May 1889) was an Australian cricketer. He played five first-class matches for New South Wales between 1880/81 and 1884/85.

See also
 List of New South Wales representative cricketers

References

External links
 

1846 births
1889 deaths
Australian cricketers
New South Wales cricketers
People from Penshurst